Sylt Frisian, or Söl'ring, is the dialect of the North Frisian language spoken on the island of Sylt in the German region of North Frisia. Söl'ring refers to the Söl'ring Frisian word for Sylt, Söl.  Together with the Fering, Öömrang, and Heligolandic dialects, it forms part of the insular group of North Frisian dialects.  It differs from the mainland dialects because of its relatively strong Danish influence. Due to mass tourism on Sylt, the dialect has been largely displaced by forms of German and Söl'ring is spoken only by a few hundred people, many of whom no longer reside on Sylt.  Although it is taught in several primary schools, its prospects for survival are unfavorable compared with other insular dialects.  An online dictionary is available for looking up German to Söl'ring translations and vice versa.

Sample text

References

External links 
Sölring Online Dictionary (academic project)

Sylt
North Frisian language